The 1946 LFF Lyga was the 25th season of the LFF Lyga football competition in Lithuania.  It was contested by 8 teams, and Dinamo Kaunas won the championship.

League standings

References
RSSSF

LFF Lyga seasons
1946 in Lithuanian sport
Lith